The Walawe is a  long river in Sri Lanka which initiates from Adam's Peak. It meets the Indian Ocean at the coastal town of Ambalantota.

See also 
 List of rivers of Sri Lanka

References

Rivers of Sri Lanka